Live: A Night on the Strip is a live recording by L.A. Guns which occurred October 7, 1999, at the Key Club on Sunset Boulevard in Hollywood.

Track listing
 "Face Down"
 "Sex Actions 
 "One More Reason"
 "Kiss My Love Goodbye"
 "Bitch Is Back"
 "Time"
 "Long Time Dead"
 "Over the Edge"
 "Never Enough"
 "Nothing Better to Do"
 "Guitar Solo"
 "Electric Gypsy"
 "Ballad of Jayne"
 "Rip N Tear"

Personnel
Phil Lewis - vocals
Tracii Guns - guitar
Mick Cripps - guitar
Kelly Nickels - bass guitar
Steve Riley - drums

References

L.A. Guns live albums
2000 live albums